Sharmila Kumari Panta  is a Former Governor of Sudurpashchim Province . She was sworn on 4 November 2019 by President Bidhya Devi Bhandari. She has been The president of Disappeared Family Society , Member of  Board of Directors of Nepal Airlines Corporation and Member of Conflict Affected Persons and Structure Data Collection Task Force.

See also 
  Somnath Adhikari
  Tilak Pariyar
  Bishnu Prasad Prasain	
  Amik Sherchan
 Dharmanath Yadav
 Govinda Prasad Kalauni

External links

References
2.^   "

https://english.khabarhub.com/2021/03/181414/41" 4/

Living people
Communist Party of Nepal (Maoist Centre) politicians
1969 births
Governors of Sudurpashchim Province